Les Nouvelles Calédoniennes (The Caledonian News) is a daily, French-language newspaper published in New Caledonia since June 15, 1971. New Caledonia's only daily publication, the newspaper does not publish a Sunday edition. Les Nouvelles Calédoniennes was owned by Groupe Hersant Média until 2013, when the Caledonian private investors took its ownership.

External links
Les Nouvelles Calédoniennes official site

Newspapers published in New Caledonia
Mass media in New Caledonia
Newspapers established in 1971
French-language newspapers